The Emirates Airline Wellington Sevens is played annually as part of the IRB Sevens World Series for international rugby sevens (seven-a-side version of rugby union). The 2008 competition, which took place on 1 and 2 February was the third Cup trophy in the 2007–08 IRB Sevens World Series.

Pool stages

Pool A
{| class="wikitable" style="text-align: center;"
|-
!width="200"|Team
!width="40"|Pld
!width="40"|W
!width="40"|D
!width="40"|L
!width="40"|PF
!width="40"|PA
!width="40"|+/-
!width="40"|Pts
|- 
|align=left| 
|3||3||0||0||103||7||+96||9
|-
|align=left| 
|3||2||0||1||60||29||+31||7 
|-
|align=left| 
|3||1||0||2||37||85||-48||5
|-
|align=left| 
|3||0||0||3||21||90||-69||3
|}

Pool B
{| class="wikitable" style="text-align: center;"
|-
!width="200"|Team
!width="40"|Pld
!width="40"|W
!width="40"|D
!width="40"|L
!width="40"|PF
!width="40"|PA
!width="40"|+/-
!width="40"|Pts
|- 
|align=left| 
|3||3||0||0||88||28||+60||9
|-
|align=left| 
|3||2||0||1||48||52||-4||7 
|-
|align=left| 
|3||1||0||2||42||74||-32||5
|-
|align=left| 
|3||0||0||3||29||53||-24||3
|}

Pool C
{| class="wikitable" style="text-align: center;"
|-
!width="200"|Team
!width="40"|Pld
!width="40"|W
!width="40"|D
!width="40"|L
!width="40"|PF
!width="40"|PA
!width="40"|+/-
!width="40"|Pts
|- 
|align=left| 
|3||3||0||0||86||28||+58||9
|-
|align=left| 
|3||2||0||1||57||38||+19||7 
|-
|align=left| 
|3||1||0||2||26||52||-26||5
|-
|align=left| 
|3||0||0||3||21||72||-51||3
|}

Pool D
{| class="wikitable" style="text-align: center;"
|-
!width="200"|Team
!width="40"|Pld
!width="40"|W
!width="40"|D
!width="40"|L
!width="40"|PF
!width="40"|PA
!width="40"|+/-
!width="40"|Pts
|- 
|align=left| 
|3||2||1||0||52||19||+33||8
|-
|align=left| 
|3||2||0||1||57||50||+7||7 
|-
|align=left| 
|3||1||1||1||31||52||-21||6
|-
|align=left| 
|3||0||0||3||36||55||-19||3
|}

Knockout

Shield

Bowl

Plate

Cup

Round 3 table
 

 was the second team to score over 1,000 overall points in the Group Stage of this tournament.

External links
 New Zealand Rugby 7s
 IRB Sevens
 New Zealand 7s on irb.com

Wellington Sevens
Wellington
2008